Nova Kapela is a municipality in Brod-Posavina County, Croatia. There are 4,227 inhabitants in the following settlements:
 Batrina, population 1,005
 Bili Brig, population 272
 Donji Lipovac, population 248
 Dragovci, population 362
 Gornji Lipovac, population 88
 Magić Mala, population 398
 Nova Kapela, population 907
 Pavlovci, population 40
 Seoce, population 284
 Siče, population 306
 Srednji Lipovac, population 302
 Stara Kapela, population 15

In the 2011 Croatian census, 98.53% declared themselves Croats.

Nova Kapela is a birthplace of Croatian poet and writer Ivanka Brađašević and actor Emil Glad.

See also
Nova Kapela–Batrina railway station

References

Municipalities of Croatia
Populated places in Brod-Posavina County